A longitudinal study (or longitudinal survey, or panel study) is a research design that involves repeated observations of the same variables (e.g., people) over short or long periods of time (i.e., uses longitudinal data). It is often a type of observational study, although it can also be structured as longitudinal randomized experiment.

Longitudinal studies are often used in social-personality and clinical psychology, to study rapid fluctuations in behaviors, thoughts, and emotions from moment to moment or day to day; in developmental psychology, to study developmental trends across the life span; and in sociology, to study life events throughout lifetimes or generations; and in consumer research and political polling to study consumer trends. The reason for this is that, unlike cross-sectional studies, in which different individuals with the same characteristics are compared, longitudinal studies track the same people, and so the differences observed in those people are less likely to be the result of cultural differences across generations, that is, the cohort effect. Longitudinal studies thus make observing changes more accurate and are applied in various other fields. In medicine, the design is used to uncover predictors of certain diseases. In advertising, the design is used to identify the changes that advertising has produced in the attitudes and behaviors of those within the target audience who have seen the advertising campaign. Longitudinal studies allow social scientists to distinguish short from long-term phenomena, such as poverty. If the poverty rate is 10% at a point in time, this may mean that 10% of the population are always poor or that the whole population experiences poverty for 10% of the time.

Longitudinal studies can be retrospective (looking back in time, thus using existing data such as medical records or claims database) or prospective (requiring the collection of new data).

Cohort studies are one type of longitudinal study which sample a cohort (a group of people who share a defining characteristic, typically who experienced a common event in a selected period, such as birth or graduation) and perform cross-section observations at intervals through time. However, not all longitudinal studies are cohort studies, as longitudinal studies can instead include a group of people who do not share a common event.

Advantages 
When longitudinal studies are observational, in the sense that they observe the state of the world without manipulating it, it has been argued that they may have less power to detect causal relationships than experiments. However, because of the repeated observation at the individual level, they have more power than cross-sectional observational studies, by virtue of being able to exclude time-invariant unobserved individual differences and also of observing the temporal order of events. 

Longitudinal studies do not require large numbers of participants (as in the examples below). Qualitative longitudinal studies may include only a handful of participants, and longitudinal pilot or feasibility studies often have fewer than 100 participants.

Disadvantages 
Some of the disadvantages of longitudinal study are that they are time-consuming and expensive. Therefore, they are not convenient.

Longitudinal studies cannot avoid attrition effect, that is, subjects cannot continue to participate in the study for various reasons. Under longitudinal research methods, the loss of the research sample will bias the remaining small sample. Practice effect is also one of the problems. Longitudinal studies tend to be biased by the fact that subjects repeat the same procedure many times, and their performance will be improved or decreased.

Examples

See also 
 Cross-sectional study
 Time series
 Repeated measures design

References

External links 
ESDS Longitudinal data service
Centre for Longitudinal Studies
National Centre for Longitudinal Data

Research methods
Epidemiological study projects
Statistical data types
Design of experiments
Cohort study methods
Nursing research
Social research